The 2012 American Express – TED Open was a professional tennis tournament played on hard courts. It was the 25th edition of the tournament which was part of the 2012 ATP Challenger Tour. It took place in Istanbul, Turkey between 10 and 16 September 2012.

Singles main-draw entrants

Seeds

 1 Rankings are as of August 27, 2012.

Other entrants
The following players received wildcards into the singles main draw:
  Haluk Akkoyun
  Durukan Durmus
  Baris Erguden
  Efe Yurtacan

The following players received entry from the qualifying draw:
  Maximilian Abel
  Lewis Burton
  Riccardo Ghedin
  James McGee

Champions

Singles

 Dmitry Tursunov def.  Adrian Mannarino, 6–4, 7–6(7–5)

Doubles

 Karol Beck /  Lukáš Dlouhý def.  Adrián Menéndez /  John Peers, 3–6, 6–2, [10–6]

External links
Official Website

American Express - TED Open
PTT İstanbul Cup
2012 in Turkish tennis